The Mayhem Festival is a touring summer music and extreme sports festival that toured annually from 2008 to 2015. The following is a partial list of bands that performed on the festival since its inception to end.

Mayhem Festival